Jussecourt-Minecourt is a commune in the Marne department in north-eastern France.

Geography
The Chée flows west-southwestward through the commune.

See also
Communes of the Marne department

References

Jussecourtminecourt